Feminist Party of Spain (in Spanish: Partido Feminista de España, PFE) is a feminist political party which operates in Spain. It was founded in 1979 by the feminist, anti-fascist, and communist activist Lidia Falcón.

History
In 1983, the 1st congress of the party was held in Barcelona, where the executive committee was elected. The members of it were: Lidia Falcón, Carmen Sarmiento, Maria Encarna Sanahuja, Mercedes Izquierdo, Montserrat Fernández Casido, Pilar Altamira, Siurana Elvira, Isabel Marin, and Maria Angeles Piquero.

In the European Parliament elections of 1999, the party promoted the creation of the Confederation of Feminist Organizations, that won 28,901 votes (0.14%).

During its second congress, held from 25 to 26 July 2015, PFE decided to join United Left to participate in general elections of that year within the strategy of "popular unity".

On 22 February 2020, the IU's Political and Social Assembly approved to expel the PFE from the organization on the basis of the latter's "repeated statutory breaches and the holding of positions contrary to those approved in the IU bodies".

References

1979 establishments in Spain
Communist parties in Spain
Feminist parties in Europe
Political parties established in 1979
United Left (Spain)